Helga Koch (born 3 January 1942) is a German former fencer. She competed in the women's team foil event at the 1968 Summer Olympics.

References

External links
 

1942 births
Living people
German female fencers
Olympic fencers of West Germany
Fencers at the 1968 Summer Olympics
Sportspeople from Offenbach am Main
20th-century German women
21st-century German women